Jeremias Martin Rodríguez Puch (born 15 May 1999) is an Argentine footballer currently playing as a midfielder for San Martín SJ.

Career statistics

Club

Notes

References

1999 births
Living people
Argentine footballers
Argentine expatriate footballers
Association football midfielders
Liga Portugal 2 players
Club Atlético River Plate footballers
Académico de Viseu F.C. players
San Martín de San Juan footballers
Argentine expatriate sportspeople in Portugal
Expatriate footballers in Portugal
Footballers from Buenos Aires